Valadier is a surname. People with that name include:

 Giuseppe Valadier (1762-1839), Italian architect and designer, urban planner and archeologist
 Jean Valadier (1878-1959), French lawyer, administrator and politician

See also
 The Valadiers, American vocal group, active intermittently from 1959